Mouilleron-Saint-Germain is a commune in the department of Vendée, western France. The municipality was established on 1 January 2016 by merger of the former communes of Mouilleron-en-Pareds and Saint-Germain-l'Aiguiller.

See also 
Communes of the Vendée department

References 

Communes of Vendée
Populated places established in 2016
2016 establishments in France
States and territories established in 2016